Ernest Weber (February 29, 1908 – May 13, 1950) was an American racewalker. He competed in the men's 10 kilometres walk at the 1948 Summer Olympics.

References

1908 births
1950 deaths
Athletes (track and field) at the 1948 Summer Olympics
American male racewalkers
Olympic track and field athletes of the United States
Place of birth missing